The 2022–23 season is Buriram United's 11th season in the Thai League. (13th if including P.E.A.'s two seasons) The club will participate in the Thai League and two domestic cups: FA Cup and League Cup.

Buriram United kicked off the season by losing the 2022 Thailand Champions Cup to BG Pathum United 2–3.

The 2022–23 season marks Masatada Ishii's first full season in charge of Buriram. This is also the first season since 2010 not to feature Jakkaphan Kaewprom, who left at the end of the previous season to transfer to Ratchaburi, also the first season since 2014 not to feature Supachok Sarachat, who had initially been loaned to Japanese club Consadole Sapporo before transferred there permanently on 12 November 2022.

Club information

Mid-season friendly

Competitions

Overview

Champions Cup

Thai League

League table

Results overview

Matches

FA Cup

League Cup

Statistics

Appearances
Players with no appearances are not included in the list.

|-
! colspan=14 | Left club during the season

Goalscorers
Includes all competitive matches. The list is sorted by shirt number when total goals are equal. 
 Player who left the club during the season.

Clean sheets

Notes

References

External links
 Club website
 Thai League

Buriram
Buriram United F.C. seasons
Buriram